Crime Tango (German: Kriminaltango) is a 1960 Austrian musical comedy film directed by Géza von Cziffra and starring Peter Alexander, Vivi Bach and Peter Carsten. It was a remake of the 1949 West German film Dangerous Guests which had also been directed by von Cziffra.

It was shot at the Sievering Studios in Vienna.

Cast

Soundtrack
"Panoptikum" (Music by Heinz Gietz, lyrics by Kurt Feltz)

References

External links

1960 musical comedy films
Austrian black-and-white films
Films directed by Géza von Cziffra
Remakes of German films
Sascha-Film films
Gloria Film films
Films shot at Sievering Studios
Austrian musical comedy films